The 2021–22 Wright State Raiders men's basketball team represented Wright State University in the 2021–22 NCAA Division I men's basketball season. The Raiders, led by sixth-year head coach Scott Nagy, played their home games at the Nutter Center in Dayton, Ohio as members of the Horizon League. They finished the season 22–14, 15–7 in Horizon League Play to finish in fourth place. As the No. 4 seed, they defeated Oakland, Cleveland State, and Northern Kentucky to win the Horizon League tournament. They received the conference’s automatic bid to the NCAA tournament as the No. 16 seed in the South Region, where they defeated Bryant in the First Four before losing in the first round to Arizona.

Previous season
In a season limited due to the ongoing COVID-19 pandemic, the Raiders finished the 2020–21 season 18–6, 16–4 in Horizon League play to finish as Horizon League regular season co-champions, alongside Cleveland State. However, as the No. 2 seed in the Horizon League tournament, they were upset by Milwaukee in the quarterfinals.

Roster

Schedule and results

|-
!colspan=12 style=| Regular season

|-
!colspan=9 style=| Horizon League tournament

|-
!colspan=9 style=| NCAA Tournament 

Sources

References

Wright State Raiders men's basketball seasons
Wright State Raiders
Wright State Raiders men's basketball
Wright State Raiders men's basketball
Wright State